Juan Bernat Velasco (born 1 March 1993) is a Spanish professional footballer who plays as a left-back for Ligue 1 club Paris Saint-Germain.

He began his career at Valencia, featuring in three La Liga campaigns for the club. He moved to Bayern Munich in 2014, winning the Bundesliga every season during his four-year spell while appearing in 115 competitive matches. In August 2018, he signed with Paris Saint-Germain, playing in the 2020 UEFA Champions League Final and losing to his former side Bayern Munich. He suffered an anterior cruciate ligament injury in September 2020 that would keep him out for over a year.

A European champion with the under-19 team in 2012, Bernat made his senior debut for Spain in 2014.

Club career

Valencia
Born in Cullera, Valencian Community, Bernat was a product of Valencia's youth system. He made his senior debut at only 17, appearing with the reserves in Tercera División and helping them return to Segunda División B. He was brought to the main squad for the 2011 pre-season, scoring in a 3–0 away win against Sporting CP, and earned a professional contract until 2015 shortly after.

Bernat made his debut with the Ches first team in a 4–3 La Liga home victory over Racing de Santander on 27 August 2011; he started the game and was replaced at half-time, with the score at 2–1 for the visitors. His second league appearance occurred on 22 January 2012 in a 1–1 draw at Osasuna, substituting Jonas in the 57th minute. He continued featuring regularly for the B's, in the third tier.

Bernat scored his first official goal for Valencia on 28 November 2012, netting his team's last in a 3–1 home defeat of Llagostera for that season's Copa del Rey (5–1 on aggregate). He scored his first in the league roughly one year later, coming from the bench for the 1–1 equaliser at Elche (eventual 2–1 loss).

From 2013 onwards, Bernat started being utilised as a left-back.

Bayern Munich
On 7 July 2014, Bernat signed for Bayern Munich on a five-year contract. He made his debut on 13 August, playing the entirety of the 0–2 defeat to Borussia Dortmund in the DFL-Supercup, and played his first Bundesliga match nine days later, a 2–1 home win against VfL Wolfsburg.

Shortly after being placed first in Outside of the Boot's Talent Radar Top 20 Young Players of 2014, Bernat scored his first competitive goal for the Bavarians, but in a 4–1 loss at Wolfsburg on 30 January 2015.

Paris Saint-Germain
On 31 August 2018, Bernat joined Paris Saint-Germain on a three-year deal, replacing Yuri Berchiche who had left for Athletic Bilbao. His Ligue 1 debut occurred on 14 September in a home fixture against Saint-Étienne, and played the full 90 minutes in the 4–0 win. He scored his first competitive goal for the team on 6 November, in a 1–1 away draw with Napoli in the group stage of the UEFA Champions League; in the following Champions League seasons, he would also score against Liverpool, Manchester United, Borussia Dortmund and RB Leipzig.

On 16 September 2020, Bernat suffered an anterior cruciate ligament injury in a match against Metz; it was reported he would miss six months of action. On 16 March 2021, he signed an extension to keep him at the club until 2025. His return to play would come later than initially planned, on 15 October in a 2–1 league victory over Angers at the Parc des Princes.

International career

Bernat moved through the Spanish international youth setup, representing all sides between the under-16s and the under-21s. He made his debut with the former in 2009, and with the under-17 side he reached the final at the 2010 UEFA European Championship, playing alongside Valencia teammate Paco Alcácer.

In 2012, Bernat was part of the squad that won the Under-19 Championship in Estonia. On 3 October 2014, he was called up by full side manager Vicente del Bosque for UEFA Euro 2016 qualifying matches against Slovakia and Luxembourg: he made his debut on the 12th against the latter, replacing Andrés Iniesta for the final 20 minutes and scoring the last goal of a 4–0 win.

Career statistics
Club

International

Spain score listed first, score column indicates score after each Bernat goal.

HonoursBayern MunichBundesliga: 2014–15, 2015–16, 2016–17, 2017–18
DFB-Pokal: 2015–16
DFL-Supercup: 2016, 2018Paris Saint-GermainLigue 1: 2018–19, 2019–20, 2021–22
Coupe de France: 2019–20
Coupe de la Ligue: 2019–20
Trophée des Champions: 2019, 2022
UEFA Champions League runner-up: 2019–20Spain U17 
UEFA European Under-17 Championship runner-up: 2010Spain U19'
UEFA European Under-19 Championship: 2012

Notes

References

External links

CiberChe stats and bio 

1993 births
Living people
People from Ribera Baixa
Sportspeople from the Province of Valencia
Spanish footballers
Footballers from the Valencian Community
Association football defenders
Association football wingers
La Liga players
Segunda División B players
Valencia CF Mestalla footballers
Valencia CF players
Bundesliga players
FC Bayern Munich footballers
Ligue 1 players
Paris Saint-Germain F.C. players
Spain youth international footballers
Spain under-21 international footballers
Spain international footballers
Spanish expatriate footballers
Expatriate footballers in Germany
Expatriate footballers in France
Spanish expatriate sportspeople in Germany
Spanish expatriate sportspeople in France